Treffort is a commune in the Isère department in the Auvergne-Rhône-Alpes region in Southeastern France. In 2019, it had a population of 301.

Demographics

See also
Communes of the Isère department
Lac de Monteynard-Avignonet

References

Communes of Isère
Isère communes articles needing translation from French Wikipedia